"Cherry Wine" is a 1953 song by Little Esther written by Henry Glover. It is the best known of her releases from Federal Records and has been re-issued several times. Billboard noted her distinctive style and "a lively piano in the backing".

References

1953 songs
1953 singles
Soul songs
Songs written by Henry Glover
Federal Records singles
Esther Phillips songs